The 1959 Louisiana Tech Bulldogs football team was an American football team that represented the Louisiana Polytechnic Institute (now known as Louisiana Tech University) as a member of the Gulf States Conference during the 1959 NCAA College Division football season. In their nineteenth year under head coach Joe Aillet, the team compiled a 9–1 record and finished as Gulf States Conference champion.

Schedule

References

Louisiana Tech
Louisiana Tech Bulldogs football seasons
Louisiana Tech Bulldogs football